Manamadurai Junction railway station serves in the city of Manamadurai in Tamil Nadu. It belongs to Madurai railway division.

Manamadurai Junction, station code MNM, is a railway station in Sivaganga district of the Indian state of Tamil Nadu, India. It is one of the two major railway junctions of this district. The other is Karaikudi Junction which is a small junction comparably as it has only three rail branches but a major passenger railhead.

History

This station was constructed as a part of Madurai Rameswaram Branch Railway line which was constructed in Colonial India in 1902. This line was mainly constructed to connect Indian province with Ceylon Province. Later after the annexation of Sivagangai Estate, an 20 km branch line was constructed in-between Manamadurai and Sivagangai which converted this station into a railway junction and there by it became the first junction in the Ramnad region, later Pamban Became a junction by constructing a small branch line between Pamban and Dhanushkodi which spans 17 km but after 1964 rameswaram cyclone that branch line was closed. After India gained independence, a new railway line was constructed between Manamadurai and Virudhunagar under the rule of Kamaraj and this Manamadurai Virudhunagar railway line became the first railway line in Tamil Nadu to be built after Indian Independence.

Location and layout
This junction is located close to its district headquarters, Sivagangai, which is 20 km away from this junction and it is 50 km away from its railway divisional headquarters Madurai. This railway junction has 6 railway tracks and 5 platforms, usually crowded in the morning and night. It has the second largest curve. Connects with Tirunelveli, Tiruchirapalli, Chennai, and Madurai. Clean waiting hall, food, large parking space, Railway Protection Force (RPF) police station and Railway Hospital facilities are available within the station complex premise. Nearby bus stand is well connected with Cochin - Rameswaram Interstate Corridor National Highway (NH45) which is also an Asian Highway Network which is numbered as AH43, which gives 24/7 bus connectivity to various places nearby. Retiring room, railway canteen, adequate restrooms are available at this junction. This junction also has a goods terminal which generates a huge revenue to the entire madurai railway division. Mostly the goods handled here are loading and sending charcoal to various parts of India and the nearby SIDCO and SIPCOT (industrial complex area by government of Tamil Nadu) also contributes a considerable amount of profit to this junction whereas unloading of goods includes some civil supplies for the sivagangai district where it has located and various raw materials for those industries present nearby sivagangai and manamadurai region.

Importance of this junction
The Manamadurai Junction has four rail branches, each leading to Madurai, Virudhunagar, Karaikudi and Rameswaram. It is a main railway junction, so all trains have to make a technical halt at this junction. Rameswaram Destination trains have to cross this junction as there is no other railway routes exist to connect Pamban Island with Main Land India. For the convenience of long-distance passengers such as tourist places from Varanasi, Ayodhya, Ajmer who are traveling to Madurai have to deboard at this station and vice versa. From here adequate bus facilities are available to and from Madurai 24/7.

Administration

It falls under the administrative control of the Madurai Division of the Southern Railway zone of the Indian Railways. The tracks are completely electrified. It works under electric Broad Gauge. This junction comes under the control of sivaganga senior section engineer and karaikudi Assistant Divisional Engineer (ADEN).

Trains operated
It acts as the source station for Mannargudi - Tiruchirappalli - Manamadurai DEMU passenger. Once upon a time, it acted as source station for Silambu Express. During meter gauge era, it acted as a source station for Tirunelveli Manamadurai Express which is currently running as Puducherry kanyakumari weekly express and Manamadurai Quilon Express which is planned to run between Ernakulam to Velankanni Biweekly express.

Presently this junction handles various daily and weekly passenger and express trains along with some unscheduled freight trains.

References 

Madurai railway division
Railway stations in Sivaganga district
Railway junction stations in Tamil Nadu